Three Good Reasons is an album by the American musician Crystal Gayle, released in 1992. Many of its songs are about the ending of a relationship. The title track was released as the album's first single. Gayle supported the album with a North American tour.

Critical reception

The Ottawa Citizen wrote that Gayle's voice "retains its other-worldly quality, that cool distance that lets her pass through any song without getting the least bit involved in it." The Richmond Times-Dispatch called the album "a smart departure from the syrupy, pops-flavored crossover hits she had in the mid-'70s." The Miami Herald noted that "a bluesy rhythm track accents 'The Trouble With Me (Is You)' while Gayle delivers a sly, '40s style performance."

Track listing

Personnel
Crystal Gayle - lead and backing vocals
Bobby All - acoustic guitar
Joel Bouchillon - piano
Jim Ferguson - backing vocals
Ronnie Godfrey - piano
Carl Gorodetzky - violin
Rob Hajacos - fiddle
Lee Larrison - violin
Chris Leuzinger - electric guitar
Wendell Mobley - backing vocals
Pam Sixfin - violin
Brian Smith - electric guitar
Harry Stinson - backing vocals
Gary Van Osdale - viola
Billy Joe Walker Jr. - acoustic guitar, electric guitar
Cindy Richardson-Walker - backing vocals
Kris Wilkinson - viola

References

Crystal Gayle albums
1992 albums
Liberty Records albums